The Powerpuff Girls: Paint the Townsville Green is a 2D platform game developed by American studio Sennari Interactive and published by Bay Area Multimedia for the Game Boy Color. It is based on The Powerpuff Girls animated series on Cartoon Network.

Paint the Townsville Green is the second game of a three-game series, which includes The Powerpuff Girls: Bad Mojo Jojo and The Powerpuff Girls: Battle HIM. Players can trade character cards across versions when linked together with the Game Boy Color's Game Link Cable accessory.

Gameplay
This installment in the trilogy of games follows Buttercup battling the Gangreen Gang. The game plays very similar to the first one, with Buttercup controlling identically to Blossom. The game re-uses the same five level-environments and soundtrack from Bad Mojo Jojo as well.

Reception
Similarly to Bad Mojo Jojo, the game was a failure critically. DailyRadar gave the title a 50 out of 100 score, and German review outlet 64Power giving the game a 40 out of 100.

References

2000 video games
Game Boy Color games
Game Boy Color-only games
The Powerpuff Girls video games
Superhero video games
Video games developed in the United States
Cartoon Network video games